The Reporting Body Identifier is the first two digits of a Global System for Mobile Communications (GSM) Type Allocation Code, and indicates the GSMA-approved organization that registered (or, before 2002, approved) a given mobile device, and allocated the model a unique code.

The numbers are loosely based on the telephone country code (CC) of the organization identified, as most approving nations used a single approval body endorsed by their national GSM Association chapter. However, not all Reporting Body Identifiers follow this tendency.

Reporting Body Identifier codes
According to Permanent Reference Document TW.06, Appendix A of the GSM Association, the current Reporting Body Identifier (RBI) codes indicate the following approval/allocation bodies:

Normally, when a RBI is 35, the phone device supports operation on the 1800 MHz band, but if it is 01, it will not have it, e.g., Motorola and Nokia. There are some exceptions for RBI 01, e.g., on LG and Sony Ericsson.

Reporting Body Identifier vs Regional Code
The "Reporting Body Identifier" is also known as the Regional Code in the CDMA context. The International Mobile Station Equipment Identity (IMEI) and Mobile Equipment Identifier (MEID) structures are superficially the same, except that the first two digits must be decimal for an IMEI, and must be hexadecimal for an MEID. In 3GPP2 terms the GSMA is the Global Decimal Administrator while the Telecommunications Industry Association (TIA) is the Global Hexadecimal Administrator.

See also
International Mobile Station Equipment Identity
International mobile subscriber identity (IMSI)
Mobile equipment identifier

GSM standard